The 2021–22 North Florida Ospreys men's basketball team represented the University of North Florida in the 2021–22 NCAA Division I men's basketball season. The Ospreys, led by 13th-year head coach Matthew Driscoll, played their home games at the UNF Arena in Jacksonville, Florida as members of the East Division of the ASUN Conference.

Previous season
In a season limited due to the ongoing COVID-19 pandemic, the Ospreys finished the 2020–21 season 8–15, 6–6 in ASUN play to finish in fourth place. In the ASUN tournament, they lost to North Alabama in the quarterfinals.

Roster

Schedule and results

|-
!colspan=12 style=| Regular season

 

 

|-
!colspan=12 style=| ASUN tournament
|-

|-

Source

References

North Florida Ospreys men's basketball seasons
North Florida Ospreys
North Florida Ospreys men's basketball
North Florida Ospreys men's basketball